KDR 444  (Norwegian  "kortdistanseradio", Swedish "kortdistansradio", "short distance radio") or KDR,  is a licence-free personal radio service in the UHF range used in Sweden and Norway. It is usually referred to as SRBR 444 (Short Range Business Radio) in Sweden. Transmitters are limited to 2 W ERP (previously 1 W) in Sweden and 0.5 W in Norway. FM with a bandwidth of 25 kilohertz is used. Norway require a radio with fixed antenna to be used with these frequencies.

Channels
Norway has 6 channels, while Sweden has 8 channels. Note that channel 6 is different in Norway and Sweden. 

Channels use FM. Frequencies 444.875 and 444.925 are newer frequencies available in Sweden but may not be available in some other regions (such as Norway); older equipment may also lack these new frequencies. Consequently, 444.975 is likely to be called channel number six on such devices.

European use
KDR 444 is specific to parts of Scandinavia and is not cleared for use across the European Union.

See also
PMR446
UHF CB
Family Radio Service

References

Bandplans
Radio hobbies

no:Privatradio